DXMJ (97.1 FM) was a radio station owned and operated by GMA Network subsidiary Radio GMA. It was formerly known as Campus Radio from its inception in 1996 to 2010, when it closed shop due to lack of advertisers' support and financial problems.

References

Radio stations in Zamboanga City
Radio stations established in 1996
Radio stations disestablished in 2010
Defunct radio stations in the Philippines